Yee Ming Innes Bridges (born 5 November 1992) is a British-Singaporean singer-songwriter, actress and model.

Early life and education
Ming was born in Australia to a British father and a Chinese Singaporean mother. They moved to Singapore when she was six months old. Growing up, she lived in Singapore for 16 years and studied at the Tanglin Trust School before moving to England. At 17, she received a performing arts scholarship to study at Wellington College, where she earned her International Baccalaureate diploma in 2011. She briefly attended King's College London, studying business management before deciding to defer her studies in pursuit of a music career.

Acting and modelling career
In 2006, at age 13, Bridges won Teenage magazine's Teenage Icon singing competition. In 2008, she played a lead role, Roxy, on the kids detective drama R.E.M.: The Next Generation, which aired in Singapore on the Okto channel's Kids Central, and won Best Children's Programme at the 2008 Asian Television Awards. Subsequently, she took on the role of Christine in MediaCorp Channel 5's drama series Red Thread that same year. After finishing her International Baccalaureate diploma in London, she moved back to Singapore to pursue a singing career. In 2012, she appeared on Channel 8's variety show It's a Small World III alongside a multi-national panel, to discuss issues of foreigners living in Singapore. In 2013, she appeared in the Chinese horror film "Ghost Child" as Shirley, and on the reality TV series Date A Star II, which sets up celebrities on dates with other celebrities and airs in Singapore on Channel U.

Bridges appeared as a cover model on the July 2013 issue of Shape Singapore and the January 2014 issue of FHM Malaysia.

Music career
Bridges was signed to Funkie Monkies Productions in 2011 after she performed her song "I Want You Back" for its directors, Luqman Taufeek and Fahim Fadzil. She has said this was the first time she played one of her songs for anyone. The song, which she wrote when she was 14, became her first single, released in November 2011. In February 2012, she released her first album, Who Knows, featuring nine songs in English and three in Mandarin.

Yǒuxiē Nánhái Bùnéng Ài ("Some Guys") reached number 8 on Y.E.S. 93.3 FM, Mǎsàikè Shìjiè ("Mosaic World") made it into the top 10 on Y.E.S. 93.3 FM, and "Under The Stars" charted on Hot FM 91.3. In December 2012, Bridges released her second album, Ming Day - 明天, an all-mandarin album. Lèi Ruò Yǔ Xià reached number 2 on Y.E.S. 93.3 FM.

Ming received the 2012 Music Act of the Year award from Elle Singapore magazine and the My Incredible Teen Icon award at the 2013 M:idea Youth Choice Awards. She also received two awards at the 2013 Singapore Entertainment Awards, for Best Local Singer, and Best Local Album for Ming Day. In 2012, she took part in CCTV Beijing's Starry Starry Night concert. On 26 September 2013, she became the first Singaporean artist to perform on MTV Sessions, playing a set of seven of her songs in English and Mandarin, plus a cover of Selena Gomez's "Love You Like a Love Song," at Harbourfront Studios at the Resorts World Sentosa.

In January 2014, her third album, Morphosis, was released, consisting entirely of songs in English, all of which she composed. The album's first single was "Summertime Love". The second single, "You and I", was first performed on MTV Sessions.

Discography

Albums

Singles

Television / film

Awards
 Music Act of the Year, Elle Singapore magazine, 2012
 My Incredible Teen Icon, M:idea Youth Choice Awards, 2013
 Best Local Singer, Singapore Entertainment Awards, 2013
 Best Local Album, Ming Day, Singapore Entertainment Awards, 2013

References

External links
 

Australian emigrants to Singapore
Singaporean people of British descent
Singaporean people of Chinese descent
1992 births
Living people
Alumni of King's College London
Singaporean pop singers
Singaporean singer-songwriters
Singaporean Mandopop singers
21st-century Singaporean women singers